The 2011 Fergana Challenger was a professional tennis tournament played on hard courts. It was the 12th edition of the tournament which was part of the 2011 ATP Challenger Tour. It took place in Fergana, Uzbekistan between 16 and 21 May 2011.

ATP entrants

Seeds

 Rankings are as of May 9, 2011.

Other entrants
The following players received wildcards into the singles main draw:
  Temur Ismailov
  Bobur Kamiljanov
  Levan Mamtadzhi
  Abduvoris Saidmukhamedov

The following players received entry from the qualifying draw:
  Ilya Belyaev
  Richard Muzaev
  Vitali Reshetnikov
  Alexander Rumyantsev
  Ervand Gasparyan (as a Lucky loser)

Champions

Singles

 Dudi Sela def.  Greg Jones, 6–2, 6–1

Doubles

 John Paul Fruttero /  Raven Klaasen def.  Im Kyu-tae /  Danai Udomchoke, 6–0, 6–3

References

External links
Official Website
ITF Search 
ATP official site

Fergana Challenger
Fergana Challenger